Kim Yi-kyung is a South Korean actress and model. She is known for her roles in dramas Unasked Family, Extracurricular and Sweet Home.

Filmography

Film

Television series

References

External links
 
 

1997 births
Living people
21st-century South Korean actresses
South Korean female models
South Korean television actresses
South Korean film actresses